Ellen Woodlock was an Irish philanthropist, who helped set up a number of institutions which provided social services to the poor in Dublin.
Born Ellen Mahony, in Cork in 1811 her father Martin Mahony ran a successful wool milling business to Cork, 
Ellen was married in 1830 and widowed quite young, just before the birth of her only son, Thomas.  
Ellen Woodlock, a sister of Francis Sylvester Mahony and was the sister in law of Rev. Dr. Bartholomew Woodlock, who was President of All Hallows College and Rector of the Catholic University of Ireland. 
She intended joining a religious community in France but after spending a few years in that country (with her son in a nearby school) returned to Cork and then moved to Dublin. In Drumcondra, Dublin she met Sarah Atkinson with whom she worked on many initiatives. 
She helped establish St. Joseph's Institution in Dublin in 1855. Along with her daughter in law and Sarah Atkinson she established the Children's Hospital at 9 Buckingham Street in 1872, which later moved to Temple Street, which she visited every day.

She died in 1884.

References

1811 births
1884 deaths
People from County Cork
19th-century Irish people
19th-century Irish businesspeople